Amped is the fourth studio album by Seven Witches, and the first to feature vocalist Alan Tecchio, bassist Kevin Bolembach, and drummer Jeff Curenton.

Amped is very different from any previous material Seven Witches released, with the album being darker, heavier, and more brutal. According to bandleader and guitarist Jack Frost, this is a more mature album, and not the "old metal" cliché like the previous albums.

Amped has mostly received poor reviews. Most of the fans didn't like the band's new sound and thought the production was too sloppy.

Track listing
All lyrics and music by Alan Tecchio and Jack Frost respectively

 West Nile (3:44) - inspired by the West Nile virus
 Sunnydale High (4:18) - inspired by Buffy the Vampire Slayer
 Dishonor Killings (4:22) - inspired by Honor killing
 GP Fix (3:40) - inspired by MotoGP
 Be (4:53)
 Fame Gets You Off (6:04)
 Flesh For Fantasy (Billy Idol) (4:30)
 Red (3:11) - inspired by Hellboy
 Widows & Orphans (5:45)

Personnel
Band
Alan Tecchio - Vocals
Jack Frost - Guitars
Kevin Bolembach - Bass
Jeff Curenton - Drums
With
Eric Ragno - Keyboards & Piano
Patrick Johansson - Drums on Track 1
Dennis Hayes - Bass on Track 2

References

2005 albums
Seven Witches albums
Regain Records albums